is a 1954 Japanese drama film directed by Kaneto Shindō and starring Nobuko Otowa.

Plot
Toku shares a shack in a shanty village in Kawasaki with his friend Pin-chan. On his way to the steel factory where he works, Toku meets an exhausted, starving woman, Tsuru, whom he reluctantly gives some of his food. The factory is on strike, but instead of joining the unionists, who are attacked by strikebreakers, he spends his little money at the bicycle races. After returning home to his shack, he discovers that Tsuru followed him. The two men try to get rid of the seemingly disturbed woman, but let her stay after she gives them her money. Tsuru tells the people of the village her story: An expatriate from Manchuria, she lost her textile factory job due to a strike, then was robbed of her severance pay, raped, sold to a brothel in Tsuchiura, from which she escaped with a friend from Kawasaki. Toku and Pin-chan sell her to a local brothel, run by the landlord on whose territory the shanty town stands, telling the gullible Tsuru that Pin-cha needs the money for his education. After throwing Tsuru out for her whimsical behaviour, the landlord demands his money back, including compensation for broken goods. Tsuru earns the money by working as a prostitute outside the train station. Following a fight (and possible rape attempt), Pin-chan throws Tsuru out of the shack. Back at the station, the other prostitutes try to beat Tsuru up. She fends them off with a stolen policeman's revolver and is finally shot dead by the police. At her wake, a letter of Tsuru is read, encouraging the villagers to resist the landlord who wants to turn the territory into a motorcycle racetrack. Toku and Pin-chan mourn her death, admitting their guilt in her fate.

Cast
 Nobuko Otowa as Tsuru
 Jūkichi Uno as Pin-chan
 Taiji Tonoyama as Toku
 Mutsuhiko Tsurumaru as Nishimura
 Ichiro Sugai as Landlord
 Tsutomu Shimomoto as Sugimura
 Sō Yamamura as Businessman
 Noriko Matsuyama as Asako
 Mayuri Mokusho as Hiromi
 Hiroshi Kondo as Teruaki
 Yoshi Katō as Doctor

Reception
Japanese film scholar Alexander Jacoby describes Dobu as "a searing account of urban poverty". Though critical of its sentimentality, film historian Donald Richie pointed out that the "images had a strength that made one remember them", comparing Dobu to Vittorio De Sica's Miracle in Milan.

References

External links

1954 films
1950s Japanese-language films
Japanese drama films
Japanese black-and-white films
Films directed by Kaneto Shindo
Films scored by Akira Ifukube
Films set in Kanagawa Prefecture
1954 drama films
1950s Japanese films